Menominee County is a county located in the Upper Peninsula in the U.S. state of Michigan. As of the 2020 Census, the population was 23,502. The county seat is Menominee. The county's name comes from an American Indian word meaning "wild rice eater" used to describe a tribe. The county was created in 1861 from area partitioned out of Delta County, under the name of Bleeker. When county government was organized in 1863, the name was changed to Menominee.

Menominee County is part of the Marinette, WI–MI Micropolitan Statistical Area.

Geography

Major highways
  – enters west line of county from Dickinson County. Runs E to intersection with US 41 at Powers.
  – runs north from S tip of county to Powers, then E through Wilson and Indiantown into Delta County.
  – runs NE from Menominee along edge of Green Bay, into Delta County.
  – runs NW-SE through northern part of county. Passes Labranche, Whitney, and Perronville.

Airport
 Menominee–Marinette Twin County Airport  - in NW Menominee, is a public-owned public-use general-aviation airport.

Adjacent counties
By land

 Dickinson County (northwest)
 Marquette County (north, Eastern Time Zone border)
 Delta County (northeast, Eastern Time Zone border)

By the Menominee River

 Marinette County, Wisconsin (west)

By Green Bay

 Door County, Wisconsin (east)

Demographics

The 2010 United States Census indicates Menominee County had a population of 24,029. This decrease of 1,297 people from the 2000 United States Census represents a 5.1% population decrease. In 2010 there were 10,474 households and 6,819 families residing in the county. The population density was 23 people per square mile (9/km2). There were 14,227 housing units at an average density of 14 per square mile (5/km2). 95.3% of the population were White, 2.7% Native American, 0.3% Black or African American, 0.3% Asian, 0.2% of some other race and 1.2% of two or more races. 1.2% were Hispanic or Latino (of any race). 28.2% were of German, 13.1% French, French Canadian or Cajun, 8.4% Polish, 6.5% Swedish, 5.2% Irish and 5.2% American ancestry.

There were 10,474 households, out of which 24.0% had children under the age of 18 living with them, 51.1% were married couples living together, 9.1% had a female householder with no husband present, and 34.9% were non-families. 30.4% of all households were made up of individuals, and 12.6% had someone living alone who was 65 years of age or older. The average household size was 2.26 and the average family size was 2.77.

The county population contained 21.0% under the age of 18, 6.5% from 18 to 24, 20.8% from 25 to 44, 32.7% from 45 to 64, and 19.1% who were 65 years of age or older. The median age was 46.2 years. The population was 50.3% male and 49.7% female.

The median income for a household in the county was $42,014 and the median income for a family was $50,007. The per capita income for the county was $21,886. About 11.1% of people in families and 14.2% of the population were below the poverty line, including 22.6% of those under age 18 and 10.9% of those age 65 or over.

Government
Menominee County was strongly Republican-leaning at its start, but has been more middle-leaning during the 20th century. Since 1876, the Republican Party nominee has carried the county vote in 69% of the elections (25 of 36 elections).

Menominee County operates the County jail, maintains rural roads, operates the major local courts, records deeds, mortgages, and vital records, administers public health regulations, and participates with the state in the provision of social services. The county board of commissioners controls the budget and has limited authority to make laws or ordinances. In Michigan, most local government functions – police and fire, building and zoning, tax assessment, street maintenance etc. – are the responsibility of individual cities and townships.

Elected officials

 Prosecuting Attorney: Jeffrey Rogg 
 Sheriff: Michael Holmes 
 County Clerk/Register of Deeds: Marc Kleiman
 County Treasurer: Barbara Parrett 
 Drain Commissioner: Caleb Kleiman 
 Road Commissioners: Ken Bower, James Marsicek, Leonard Kosewski
 

 Menominee County Departments</ref>

Communities

Cities
 Menominee (county seat)
 Stephenson

Villages
 Carney
 Daggett
 Powers

Civil townships

 Cedarville Township
 Daggett Township
 Faithorn Township
 Gourley Township
 Harris Township
 Holmes Township
 Ingallston Township
 Lake Township
 Mellen Township
 Menominee Township
 Meyer Township
 Nadeau Township
 Spalding Township
 Stephenson Township

Unincorporated communities

 Birch Creek
 Cedar River
 Eagles Nest
 Faithorn
 Harris
 Hannahville
 Hermansville
 Indiantown
 Ingalls
 Labranche
 Leapers
 Nadeau
 Perronville
 Wallace
 Whitney
 Wilson

Indian reservations
The Hannahville Indian Community occupies several scattered territories within Menominee County, mostly within Harris Township and a small piece extending into Gourley Township.  Another smaller piece extends east into neighboring Bark River Township in Delta County.

Education
School districts include:
 Bark River-Harris School District
 Carney-Nadeau Public Schools
 Menominee Area Public Schools
 Norway-Vulcan Area Schools
 North Central Area Schools
 Stephenson Area Public Schools

Hannahville Indian School, a Bureau of Indian Education-affiliated tribal school (which also functions as a charter school), is in the county.

See also
 List of Michigan State Historic Sites in Menominee County, Michigan
National Register of Historic Places listings in Menominee County, Michigan

References

External links
 Menominee County web site
Menominee County Profile, Sam M Cohodas Regional Economist, Tawni Hunt Ferrarini, Ph.D.

 
Michigan counties
Marinette micropolitan area
1863 establishments in Michigan
Populated places established in 1863